Bacillus virus G is a bacteriophage (phage) that infects Bacillus bacteria. The phage has been reported to have the largest genome of all discovered Myoviridae with nearly 700 protein-coding genes.

References

External links
 European Nucleotide Archive: Bacillus phage G

Myoviridae
Bacillus phages